Qazıqulu (Qazqulu) (also, Gazkulu) is a village and municipality in the Tovuz Rayon of Azerbaijan.  It has a population of 702.

References 

Populated places in Tovuz District